The 15th Assembly District of Wisconsin is one of 99 districts in the Wisconsin State Assembly. Located in southeastern Wisconsin, the district comprises parts of western Milwaukee County and eastern Waukesha County.  It contains all of the city of New Berlin and part of the city of West Allis.  The district is represented by Republican Dave Maxey, since January 2023.

The 15th Assembly district is located within Wisconsin's 5th Senate district, along with the 13th and 14th Assembly districts.

List of past representatives

References 

Wisconsin State Assembly districts
Milwaukee County, Wisconsin
Waukesha County, Wisconsin